Elwyn Crocker Jr. and Mary Crocker were two American children whose remains were discovered buried in their family's backyard in Effingham County, Georgia in December 2018.

Victims 
Elwyn Crocker Jr., age 14, disappeared in November 2016. He was the older brother of Mary Crocker, who disappeared two years later, at age 13, in October 2018. Sometime before, the children's father and stepmother had withdrawn each child from classes at South Effingham Middle School, informing school officials that both siblings would be homeschooled. Neither child was ever reported to be missing, and their disappearances were only discovered after the local police department received a tip from a family relative who believed that Mary Crocker was deceased. After police officers interviewed the children's father, Elwyn Crocker Sr., they decided to search the grounds of the family's residence in Guyton, Georgia. 

Human remains were discovered on the property on December 20, 2018, Mary Crocker's 14th birthday, and the Effingham County coroner noted that Elwyn Crocker Jr. would have been 17 years old. The cause of deaths for the children had not been determined as of December 26.

Suspects 
Elwyn Crocker Sr., the 49-year-old father of both children, was arrested. He had recently worked in Rincon, Georgia, as a Santa for Walmart. Also arrested were Crocker's wife (and the children's stepmother), 33-year-old Candice Crocker; her mother, Kim Wright, age 50; Wright's male companion, Anthony Prater, 55 years old; and Mark Anthony Wright, the brother of Candice Crocker. All five adults were charged with concealing a death as well as child cruelty.

At the time of the arrests, a third child who lived in the home was taken into the care of Effingham County social services.

See also
List of solved missing persons cases
List of unsolved murders

References 

2010s missing person cases
2018 in Georgia (U.S. state)
Child abuse incidents and cases
Incidents of violence against boys
Missing person cases in Georgia (U.S. state)
Unsolved murders in the United States
Violence against children
Incidents of violence against girls